Mario Agiu (born 5 March 1956) is a Romanian former footballer who played as a central defender. He was for a short while manager at CS Târgoviște in the 1983–84 Divizia A season.

Honours
Steaua București
Divizia A: 1975–76, 1977–78
Cupa României: 1975–76, 1978–79

References

1956 births
Living people
Romanian footballers
Romania under-21 international footballers
Association football defenders
Liga I players
Liga II players
FC Steaua București players
FC Olimpia Satu Mare players
FCM Târgoviște players
ASC Oțelul Galați players
FC Rapid București players
Romanian football managers
Footballers from Bucharest